Jennifer Fonstad is an American venture capital investor and entrepreneur. She co-founded and leads the Owl Capital Group, a venture firm based in Silicon Valley. Fonstad has been a leading technology, healthcare, and energy investor for almost 25 years with 17 years as a Managing Director of Draper Fisher Jurvetson (DFJ). She is also co-founder of angel investing network Broadway Angels. Fonstad has been recognized as a top 100 tech investor on Forbes’ Midas List twice and was named 2016 Venture Capitalist of the Year by Deloitte. She is also a Founding Member of All Raise.

Education
Fonstad earned a Bachelor of Science in International Economics from Georgetown University and an MBA with Distinction from Harvard Business School. While a student at Harvard, Fonstad co-founded the New Venture Competition, an annual competition for HBS student entrepreneurs.

Career
Fonstad began her career at Bain & Company after spending a year teaching high school math in sub-Saharan Africa. She joined venture capital firm Draper Fisher Jurvetson as a Kauffman Fellow in 1997 and became a partner in 1998. Fonstad spent 17 years with DFJ, helping to grow the firm from $150MM to $3.5Billion under management. Through her career Fonstad has participated in many successful investments including Athenahealth, Tesla, Solarcity, the Real Real, Chime Bank, Hotmail, Netzero, Box, Redfin, and others.

In 2010, Fonstad and Sonja Hoel Perkins were among the founders of Broadway Angels, an angel investing network of senior women from the fields of technology and venture investing. In 2019 Fonstad co-founded Owl Capital Group. Her current investments include Vida Health, Ohmconnect, Grokker, Stem.io, Roofstock, WelcomeTech, and Owlet.

Board member and advisor 
Fonstad serves on the Board of Directors of several private companies. She also serves on the board of the Mastercard Foundation, a $35B AUM foundation based in Toronto, Canada. She is a Founding Member of All-Raise, a Managing Member of Broadway Angels, and a member of the Council on Foreign Relations.

Recognition and awards 

 One of “The 50 Most Powerful Moms” by Working Mother (2017)
 “Venture Capitalist of the Year” by Deloitte at the Technology Fast 500 (2016)
 Portraits of Power, Marie Claire (2016)
 Forbes Midas List (2008, 2009)

Speaker and commentator 
At the Catalyst Conference 2017, she spoke at the Fireside Chat.

Fonstad is a frequent media contributor on issues pertaining to women in tech, cyber-security, the future of healthcare and the venture capital industry. Her commentary appears in Fortune, Fast Company, Entrepreneur, Re/code, Yahoo Finance, Forbes, Bloomberg, and CNBC.

References

External links 
 Owl Capital website
 Broadway Angels website
 Jennifer Fonstad Twitter

Year of birth missing (living people)
Living people
American venture capitalists
Georgetown University alumni
Harvard Business School alumni